{{DISPLAYTITLE:Nu2 Coronae Borealis}}

Nu2 Coronae Borealis is a solitary, orange-hued star located in the northern constellation of Corona Borealis. It is faintly visible to the naked eye, having an apparent visual magnitude of +5.4. Based upon an annual parallax shift of 5.49 mas, it is located roughly 590 light years from the Sun. At that distance, the visual magnitude is diminished by an extinction of 0.1 due to interstellar dust.

This is an evolved red giant star with a stellar classification of K5 III. At its estimated distance, this yields a physical size of about 50 times the radius of the Sun. Nu2 Coronae Borealis is radiating 530 times the Sun's luminosity from its photosphere at an effective temperature of 3,940 K.

References

K-type giants
Corona Borealis
Corona Borealis, Mu
Durchmusterung objects
Coronae Borealis, 21
147767
080214
6108